Arthur Stopford Francis (14 June 1854 – January 1908) was an English first-class cricketer active 1880–87 who played for Middlesex. He was born in Upminster; it is not known where he died.

References

1854 births
1908 deaths
People from Upminster
Sportspeople from Essex
English cricketers
Middlesex cricketers
Date of death missing
North v South cricketers